Brentley Frazer is an Australian poet widely known for his dirty realist, gritty, Gen. X memoir Scoundrel Days (UQP, 2017).  

Brentley has been a guest at numerous literary festivals, poetry readings, culture conserves and academic conferences, including: The Queensland Poetry Festival, The Australian National Poetry Festival, The Sydney Poetry Festival, Brisbane Writers Festival, The Wellington International Poetry Festival, The Oxfam Bookfest in London, "Spoken" and "Couplet" at the State Library of Queensland, The Sydney Writers Festival, Asia Pacific Writers and Translators and the Australasian Association of Writing Programs (Massey University 2014, Swinburne University 2015, University of Canberra 2016).

From 2001-2013 he was publisher and editor of Retort Magazine  and was co-founder of The Vision Area (1998-2000) and a founding member of the Brisbane spoken word event Speed Poets (2003 - 2017). In 2012 he completed a MA at James Cook University under the supervision of Lindsay Simpson. In December 2017 he was awarded a Doctor of Philosophy from Griffith University under the supervision of Nigel Krauth and the poet Anthony Lawrence.

Brentley's memoir Scoundrel Days: a memoir was published by University of Queensland Press in March, 2017.

Published works
Novels
 Scoundrel Days: A Memoir, UQP University of Queensland Press (Australia, 2017) 
 Brilliant Future - The Butcher's Saga (with Fakie Wilde), Impressed Publishing (Australia, 2004) 
Poetry
 Opera of Destruction, Homunculus Publications (Australia, 1991) 
 Oneirodynia, laTorre Press (Australia, 1993)
 Blood Psalms, Sabazeos Books (Australia, 1995)
 Fugue, Sabazeos Books (Australia, 1996) 
 A Dark Samadhi, PCPress (Australia, New Zealand, 2003) 
 Memories Like Angels at a Ball Tripping Over Their Gowns, Black Star Books (Australia 2007)
 Tableland Phantoms, Retort Books (Digital 2013) 
 Kulturkampf: new + selected poems, Bareknuckle Books (Australia, 2015) 
 Aboriginal to Nowhere: new poems, HeadworX (New Zealand, 2016) 
Academic Papers
 Aboriginal to Nowhere ~ Song Cycle of the Post Modern Dispossessed
 Untitled Plane Crash
 Beyond Is: Creative Writing with English Prime
 A Greener Pasture

Publications (as editor)
Journals
 Retort Magazine ISSN 1445-7164 (2001 - 2014) 
 Bareknuckle Poet Journal of Letters ISSN 2204-0420 (2013 - 2020) 
 Bareknuckle Poet Journal of Letters Anthology Volume 01, 2015 
 Bareknuckle Poet Journal of Letters Anthology Volume 02, 2016 
Books
 We the Mapless: new and selected poems by Ian Mcbryde 
 Travel Under Any Star: Collected Short Stories by Venero Armanno
 Rock & Roll: Selected poems in Five Sets by Mark Pirie 
 For All The Veronicas: The Dog Who Staid - New Poems by Andrew Galan 
 Improvised Dirges: New & Selected Poems by A. G. Pettet

References

Sources 
 
 

1972 births
Australian poets
Australian memoirs
Griffith University alumni
James Cook University alumni
Living people
Generation X
Grunge lit authors
20th-century Australian people
21st-century Australian people